Thalassodes intaminata  is a species of moth in the family Geometridae, sometimes called emerald moths. It is found in Fujian China, Taiwan, Japan, Thailand, Philippines, and Indonesia (Sumatra). Until recently (2005) this species was classified as a subspecies of Thalassodes immissaria but has been upgraded to a distinct species. It is however very similar in appearance and distribution to T. immissaria, but can be distinguished by differences in male and female genitalia.

Description
The wingspan of this species is 30mm. As with most members of the genera Thalassodes, T. intaminata has wings that are sea-green in color and semi-transparent. Wings also exhibit very narrow, white, transverse lines. The antenna of males are usually bipectinate (comb-like) for 3/4 of the length, and filamentous at the end. Female antennae are entirely filamentous.

References 

Hemitheini
Moths described in 1971
Moths of Asia